Yamaguchi Dam  is one of a dozen or so dams on the Kiso River in the Nagano Prefecture, Japan. It was completed in 1957.

Trivia
The word yamaguchi (山口) means "Mountain Pass", and is a common place name in Japan. There are several dams with this name; for a list, see :ja:山口ダム

The corresponding word in Chinese, written with the same characters, is read shankou. There are at least 2 dams in China with Shankou in their names:
 Burqin Shankou Dam
 Haba River Shankou Dam

References 

Dams in Nagano Prefecture
Dams completed in 1957